Night Moves is the ninth studio album by American rock singer-songwriter Bob Seger, and his first studio album to credit the Silver Bullet Band. The album was released by Capitol Records on October 22, 1976. Although the front cover only credits backing by the Silver Bullet Band, four of the nine songs on the album feature backing by the Muscle Shoals Rhythm Section.

The album was well received by critics, and brought Bob Seger nationwide success. Three singles were released from the album; two of them made the top 40 on the Billboard Hot 100. The album became Seger's second to become certified gold by the Recording Industry Association of America and was his first to be certified platinum by the same association. It later achieved a certification of sextuple platinum.

Reception 

Village Voice critic Robert Christgau wrote that the riffs on Night Moves are classic rock and roll riffs, like those performed by Chuck Berry or the Rolling Stones, and that the album is about rock and roll for those who are no longer in their teens, like the song "Rock and Roll Never Forgets". The Rolling Stone review of the album by Kit Rachlis stated that the album is one of the best to come out of 1976–77, that Seger sounds like Rod Stewart and writes lyrics like Bruce Springsteen, and that the album is classic rock and roll. The only problem that Rachlis had with the album was the production not being strong enough. A later review of the album by Stephen Thomas Erlewine for AllMusic says that the album was very similar to Beautiful Loser (1975), but Night Moves is harder than Beautiful Loser. Erlewine also feels that the album has a wide range of styles and has not lost any of its influence years later.

Cash Box said that "'Ship of Fools' might turn into a classic rocker."

Classic Rock History critic Janey Roberts ranked 4 songs from Night Moves among Seger's 20 greatest – the three singles plus "Come to Poppa".

Track listing 

 Side one tracks 1, 3, & 4 and side two track 5 were recorded by the Silver Bullet Band in Detroit.
 Track 2 was recorded in Toronto.
 Side two tracks 1 – 4 were recorded by the Muscle Shoals Rhythm Section at Muscle Shoals Sound Studios in Sheffield, Alabama.

Personnel 

Track numbering below refers to CD and digital releases of the album.

Musicians 

All tracks 
 Bob Seger – vocals, guitar, production

The Silver Bullet Band 
 Drew Abbott – guitar (tracks 1, 3, 4, 8, 9); background vocals on "Mary Lou" (track 9)
 Robyn Robbins – piano, organ (tracks 1, 3, 4, 9)
 Alto Reed – tenor saxophone, alto saxophone, baritone saxophone, flute (tracks 1, 3, 4, 9)
 Chris Campbell – bass (tracks 1, 2, 3, 4, 9); background vocals on "Mary Lou" (track 9)
 Charlie Allen Martin – drums, tambourine, maracas (tracks 1, 2, 3, 4, 9); background vocals on "Mary Lou" (track 9)

Muscle Shoals Rhythm Section
 Pete Carr – lead guitar, rhythm guitar, acoustic guitar, production (tracks 5, 6, 7, 8)
 Jimmy Johnson – rhythm guitar, production (tracks 5, 6, 7, 8)
 Barry Beckett – piano, organ, ARP synthesizer, clavinet, melodica, production (tracks 5, 6, 7, 8)
 David Hood – bass, production (tracks 5, 6, 7, 8)
 Roger Hawkins – drums, tambourine, maracas, congas, timpani, production (tracks 5, 6, 7, 8)

Additional musicians 
 Jerry Luck – accordion on "Ship of Fools" (track 8)
 Joe Miquelon – guitar on "Night Moves" (track 2)
 Doug Riley – piano, organ on "Night Moves" (track 2)
 Sharon Lee Williams – backing vocals on "Night Moves" (track 2)
 Rhonda Silver – backing vocals on "Night Moves" (track 2)
 Laurel Ward – backing vocals on "Night Moves" (track 2)

Production 
 Punch Andrews – production (tracks 1, 3, 4, 9)
 Jack Richardson – production (track 2)
 Jim Bruzzese – recording engineer, mixing engineer
 Brian Christian – recording engineer
 Jerry Masters – recording engineer
 Steve Melton – recording engineer
 Greg Miller – recording engineer
 Wally Traugott – mastering engineer
 Tom Bert – photography

Charts

Weekly charts

Year-end charts

Certifications

References

External links 
 Official website
 Bob Seger & the Silver Bullet Band - Night Moves (1976) album review by Stephen Thomas Erlewine, credits & releases at AllMusic.com
 Bob Seger & the Silver Bullet Band - Night Moves (1976) album releases & credits at Discogs.com

Bob Seger albums
1976 albums
Albums produced by Punch Andrews
Albums produced by Jack Richardson (record producer)
Albums recorded at Muscle Shoals Sound Studio
Capitol Records albums